Iraq made its Paralympic Games début at the 1992 Summer Paralympics in Barcelona. It has competed in every edition of the Summer Paralympics since then, but never in the Winter Paralympics. Iraqi Paralympians have won a total of thirteen medals: three gold, six silver and four bronze.

Medals by Summer Games

Medals by Summer Sport

Medalists

See also
 Iraq at the Olympics

References